Robert Richter (born October 23, 1929) is an American documentary filmmaker. He has been nominated for two Academy Awards for Best Documentary Short.

Early life and education
After graduating from Brooklyn Technical High School, young Robert headed west to California’s Occidental College for a Telluride Association experimental program, then to Reed College, and the Iowa Writers' Workshop.

Professional life
After the Iowa Writers Workshop, Richter joined Oregon Public Broadcasting initially as a producer-reporter, then Director of Public Affairs programs. In addition he reported from the Pacific Northwest for The New York Times. A CBS News Fellowship brought him back to New York where he earned an M.A. in Public Law and Government at Columbia University in 1964. He is the last member of the Edward R. Murrow-Fred Friendly CBS Reports unit still actively producing documentaries.

After he left CBS in 1968 to become an independent filmmaker, his company, Richter Productions, Inc. made more than 50 documentaries telecast in prime time on HBO, PBS, CBS, NBC, ABC, TBS, Discovery, BBC and major overseas television outlets.

Awards
Few documentary filmmakers have received as many honors: the Academy of Motion Pictures Arts and Sciences nominated two Richter films for best documentary short; he received a 2008 National Emmy for "exceptional merit in nonfiction filmmaking;" the duPont Columbia Broadcast Journalism award (TV's Pulitzer Prize); the Distinguished Science Reporting Award from AAAS (American Academy for Advancement of Science); Peabody Awards; many US and international film festival awards; critical acclaim in The New York Times and other major papers. Richter's many documentaries on environmental subjects earned him a Global 500 Award from the United Nations Environment Programme—the only independent producer in the world to receive this honor.

Selected filmography
 HHH: What Manner of Man (1968)
 Linus Pauling, Crusading Scientist (1977)
 Vietnam: An American Journey (1979)
 For Export Only: Pesticides (1980)
 For Export Only: Pharmaceuticals (1980)
 A Plague on our Children (1980)
 What Price Clean Air? (1982)
 Gods of Metal (1982)
 In Our Hands (1984)
 Hungry for Profit (1985)
 The Age of Intelligent Machines (1986)
 Who Shot President Kennedy? (1988)
 Can Tropical Rainforests Be Saved? (1991)
 The Money Lenders (1991)
 School of the Americas Assassins (1994)
 Ben Spock, Baby Doctor (1996)
 Father Roy: Inside the School of Assassins (1997)

References

External links

American documentary film directors
American documentary film producers
American documentary filmmakers
American television journalists
American science journalists
Environmental journalists
20th-century American journalists
20th-century American screenwriters
1929 births
Living people
Place of birth missing (living people)
Occidental College alumni
Reed College alumni
Iowa Writers' Workshop alumni
Columbia Graduate School of Arts and Sciences alumni